Passiflora cincinnata is a species of Passiflora from Brazil.

References

External links
 
 

cincinnata
Flora of Brazil